Supercritical liquid–gas boundaries are lines in the pressure-temperature (pT) diagram that delimit more liquid-like and more gas-like states of a supercritical fluid. They comprise the Fisher–Widom line, the Widom line, and the Frenkel line.

Overview

According to textbook knowledge, it is possible to transform a liquid continuously into a gas, without undergoing a phase transition, by heating and compressing strongly enough to go around the critical point. However, different criteria still allow to distinguish liquid-like and more gas-like states of a supercritical fluid. These criteria result in different boundaries in the pT plane. These lines emanate either from the critical point, or from the liquid–vapor boundary (boiling curve) somewhat below the critical point. They do not correspond to first or second order phase transitions, but to weaker singularities.

The Fisher–Widom line is the boundary between monotonic and oscillating asymptotics of the pair correlation function .

The Widom line is a generalization thereof, apparently so named by H. Eugene Stanley. However, it was first measured experimentally in 1956 by Jones and Walker, and subsequently named the 'hypercritical line' by Bernal in 1964, who suggested a structural interpretation. The Frenkel line is a boundary between "rigid" and "non-rigid" fluids characterized by the onset of transverse sound modes.

One of the above mentioned criteria is based on the velocity autocorrelation function (vacf): below the Frenkel line the vacf demonstrates oscillatory behaviour, while above it the vacf monotonically decays to zero. The second criterion is based on the fact that at moderate temperatures liquids can sustain transverse excitations, which disappear upon heating. One further criterion is based on isochoric heat capacity measurements. Therefore at the Frenkel line, where transverse excitations vanish, the isochoric heat capacity per particle should be , a direct prediction from the phonon theory of liquid thermodynamics.

Another criterion for the Widom line is a peak in the isobaric heat capacity. In the subcritical region, the phase transition is associated with an effective spike in the heat capacity (i.e., the latent heat). Approaching the critical point, the latent heat falls to zero but this is accompanied by a gradual rise in heat capacity in the pure phases near phase transition. At the critical point, the latent heat is zero but the heat capacity shows a diverging singularity. Beyond the critical point, there is no divergence, but rather a smooth peak in the heat capacity; the highest point of this peak identifies the Widom line.

Anisimov et al. (2004), without referring to Frenkel, Fisher, or Widom, reviewed thermodynamic derivatives (specific heat, expansion coefficient, compressibility) and transport coefficients (viscosity, speed of sound) in supercritical water, and found pronounced extrema as function of pressure up to 100 K above Tc.

References 

Phases of matter
Critical phenomena
Phase transitions